Pulabu is a Rai Coast language spoken in Madang Province, Papua New Guinea.

References

External links
 Pulabu Swadesh List by The Rosetta Project at the Internet Archive

Rai Coast languages
Languages of Madang Province